Sir Thomas Edward Winnington (1780 – 24 September 1839) was an English Whig and Liberal politician who sat in the House of Commons in two periods between 1807 and 1837.

Early life
Winnington was the eldest son of the Hon. Anne Foley and Sir Edward Winnington, 2nd Baronet of Stanford Court, Stanford-on-Teme, Worcestershire.  Among his siblings were the Rev. Edward Winnington-Ingram, the Rev. Francis Winnington-Ingram, the Rev. Charles Fox Winnington-Ingram, Henry Jeffries Winnington, Elizabeth Winnington (wife of the Rev. Arthur Cyril Onslow and parents of Cyril Onslow), and Harriet Winnington (the wife of Phipps Vanstittart Onslow).

His paternal grandfather was Sir Edward Winnington, 1st Baronet. His maternal grandparents were Thomas Foley, 1st Baron Foley and Hon. Grace Granville (a daughter of George Granville, 1st Baron Lansdowne).

Winnington attended Eton College from where he graduated in 1793, followed by Christ Church, Oxford, from where he graduated on 6 February 1798.

Career
He inherited the Stanford Court estate from his father in 1805 and was appointed High Sheriff of Worcestershire for 1806 to 1807.

Winnington was elected Member of Parliament (MP) for Droitwich in 1807 and held the seat until 1816. He was re elected in the 1831 general election and held the seat for a year. At the 1832 general election he was elected MP for Bewdley and held the seat until 1837, when he was succeeded there by his son Thomas.

Personal life
On 11 November 1810, Winnington married Joanna Taylor, the daughter of John Taylor of Moseley Hall, with whom he had three sons and four daughters, including:

 Sir Thomas Edward Winnington (1811–1872), who married Helen Domvile, a daughter of Sir Compton Domvile, 1st Baronet and the former Helena Sarah Trench (a daughter of Frederick Trench, MP for Maryborough).

Sir Thomas died on 24 September 1839 and was succeeded in the baronetcy by his eldest surviving son, Thomas.

References

External links

Winnington, Sir Thomas Edward, (1780-1839), 3rd Baronet at The National Archives

1780 births
1839 deaths
Baronets in the Baronetage of Great Britain
High Sheriffs of Worcestershire
Members of the Parliament of the United Kingdom for Worcestershire
People from Malvern Hills District
Place of birth missing
Place of death missing
UK MPs 1807–1812
UK MPs 1812–1818
UK MPs 1831–1832
UK MPs 1832–1835
UK MPs 1835–1837